Ust-Abakan (Khakas: Ағбан пилтiрi, Ağban piltërë) is an urban-type settlement and the administrative center of Ust-Abakansky District of the Republic of Khakassia, Russia. Population:

References

Notes

Sources

Urban-type settlements in Khakassia